Marcantonio Genua (born Marco Antonio Passeri; 1491–1563) was a Renaissance Aristotelian philosopher who taught at the University of Padua.

He was a teacher and uncle of the great Renaissance philosopher Giacomo Zabarella.

References

 Nadler, Steven M., A Companion to Early Modern Philosophy , Blackwell 2002.

1563 deaths
16th-century philosophers
Italian philosophers
Aristotelian philosophers
1491 births